Idalus decisa is a moth of the family Erebidae. It was described by Walter Rothschild in 1917. It is found in French Guiana.

References

decisa
Moths described in 1917